The Stanza Stones Trail is a  walking route from Marsden to Ilkley, along the Pennine watershed in northern England, linking six poems by Simon Armitage which have been carved into stone. It is mostly in West Yorkshire with some parts in Greater Manchester.

Origins and poems 

Simon Armitage was commissioned by the Ilkley Literature Festival in 2010 to write a set of site-specific poems, and the trail was created in 2012. Armitage wrote six poems on the theme of water in various forms: Beck, Dew, Mist, Puddle, Rain and Snow. These were carved by stone artist Pip Hall onto stones in the area of the Pennine watershed, and placed in locations selected with the help of landscape architect Tom Lonsdale. They are linked by a walking route from Armitage's home town of Marsden to the site of the festival in Ilkley. Armitage has written that "those looking hard enough might stumble across a seventh Stanza Stone, a secret stone left in an unnamed location within the Watershed area, waiting to be discovered and read."

A book called Stanza Stones, containing the poems and the accounts of Lonsdale and Hall, has been produced as a record of the journey and published by Enitharmon Press. The poems, complemented with commissioned wood engravings by Hilary Paynter, were also published in limited editions under the title In Memory of Water by Fine Press Poetry.

A group of young writers worked with Armitage to create an anthology of poems linked to the Stanza Stones. The project was criticised by a group of rock climbers who likened it to graffiti in unspoiled places.

Walk

Some of the way is over rugged open moorland.

A guide was produced by the Ilkley Literature Festival in 2012, describing the whole walk and a series of family-friendly short walks to each of the stones.

An alternative Stanza Stones Walk, a 50-mile walking route linking the stones, has been published by Mike Melvin, who says that, while the original route is "a fine outing and one that will satisfy the desires of most people wishing to visit the Stanza Stones", his purpose was "to devise an upland walk linking the stones which did not stick to recognised footpaths or to existing well-known walking trails".

Stones

The six stones are located as follows, from south to north:
The Snow Stone: Pule Hill, Marsden 
The Rain Stone: Cow's Mouth Quarry, off A58 road between Littleborough and Ripponden 
The Mist Stone: Nab Hill, near Oxenhope 
The Dew Stones: Rivock Edge, off the road from Silsden to East Morton
The Puddle Stones: Whetstone Gate Wireless Station, Rombalds Moor  
The Beck Stone: Backstone Beck, Ilkley Moor

References
{{reflist|refs=

<ref name="melvin"> Quote is from "Snow Stone" page. Website includes texts of all poems, by permission of Armitage.</ref>

}}

Bibliography

  Describing the whole project''

Long-distance footpaths in England
Footpaths in West Yorkshire
Footpaths in Greater Manchester